Spain competed at these games.

The 1988 Winter Paralympics were held in Innsbruck, Austria.   The Games did not have the same venues as the 1988 Winter Olympics.

References

Nations at the 1988 Winter Paralympics
1988
1988 in Spanish sport